Amy Crawford is the name of:

Amy Crawford (musician), from Brooklyn, NY
Amy Crawford (Nitro Girl), dancer who performed as A.C. Jazz in World Championship Wrestling
Amy Crawford (pageant titleholder), Miss Washington USA 2005